A hydrocarbon keratosis (also known as "pitch keratosis", "tar keratosis", and "tar wart") is a precancerous keratotic skin lesion that occurs in people who have been occupationally exposed to polycyclic aromatic hydrocarbons.

References 

Dermatologic terminology
Epidermal nevi, neoplasms, and cysts